Pierre Carteus (Ronse, 24 September 1943 – 4 February 2003) was a Belgian footballer who played as a midfielder. He earned two caps for the Belgium national team and participated in the 1970 FIFA World Cup.

Death
Carteus died aged 59 on 4 February 2003 in his hometown of Ronse after a long illness.

Honours
 Belgian First Division: 1972–73
 Belgian Cup: 1967–68, 1969–70

References

External links
 
 
 
 

1943 births
2003 deaths
People from Ronse
Belgian footballers
Footballers from East Flanders
Association football midfielders
Belgium international footballers
1970 FIFA World Cup players
Belgian Pro League players
Club Brugge KV players
A.S.V. Oostende K.M. players